National Freeway 3, also known as Formosa Freeway, is a freeway in Taiwan. It is the second north–south freeway in Taiwan, beginning in Keelung City at Jijin Interchange on the provincial highway 2 (Jijin Road) and ending in Linbian, Pingtung on the provincial highway 17. The freeway is also the only one in Taiwan to have a spur route, Freeway 3A. 

The highway has 58 interchanges, 15 junctions, 7 service areas and 3 rest areas en route. Aside from the 58 public interchanges, there are also some interchanges reserved for governmental usage.

Route Description
This freeway mostly serves as a bypass to major cities in Western Taiwan, traveling through suburban and rural areas. However, Freeway 3 is also the primary freeway in the counties of Nantou and Pingtung, as well as the first ever being built in these counties. Various expressways and east-west freeways link Freeway 3 with urban areas typically served by Freeway 1. The purposes of this freeway are to increase economic development in the rural area and to relieve congestion along Freeway 1. 

The freeway begins at an intersection with Provincial Highway 2 and Provincial Highway 2F in Keelung. Highway 2F, also known as Port of Keelung Western Connector, is an elevated road that connects the Port of Keelung with Freeway 3. The freeway travels in a northeast-southwest direction through the western part of Keelung before intersecting Freeway 1 in Xizhi. The freeway then travels along the mountains of New Taipei City and Taipei, bypassing the southeastern and southern edge of the Taipei metropolitan area. Connections to downtown Taipei are available through Huandong Blvd in Nangang and Freeway 3A in Wenshan. In Nangang, the freeway intersects National Freeway 5, which travels through the Xueshan Range before reaching Yilan County in Eastern Taiwan. In Yingge, the freeway meets National Freeway 2 which provides connections to downtown Taoyuan as well as Taipei's main international airport, Taoyuan International Airport. In Taoyuan, the freeway is mostly parallel to Provincial Highway 3, traveling through the mountainous areas of the city. As the freeway enters Hsinchu County it turns to a slightly east-west direction before intersecting Freeway 1 for the second time at the border of Hsinchu county and Hsinchu city. This stretch of the freeway is also known as the Northern Second Freeway.

In Miaoli County the freeway mostly parallels Freeway 1 and Provincial Highway 61 (also known as West Coast expressway) all the way to Taichung. In Taichung, the freeway intersects with National Freeway 4  just north of Taichung International Airport. The stretch from Freeway 4 to Provincial Highway 74 (Kuaiguan-Wufeng expressway) forms the western and southern portion of the Taichung Beltway. After entering Changhua County the freeway turns into a northwest-southeast direction heading towards Nantou County, intersecting Freeway 1 for the third and final time in Changhua. Before entering Nantou City the freeway meets National Freeway 6, which connects to the mountainous town of Puli and the Central Mountain Range. In Nantou, the freeway mostly travels in a north-south direction before exiting to Yunlin County, where it travels in a slight northeast-southwest direction again along Yunlin and parallels Freeway 1. This stretch of the freeway from Hsinchu to the intersection of Provincial Highway 78 (Taiwan) in Gukeng, Yunlin is also known as the Central Second Highway.

The highway continues to parallel Freeway 1 as it travels along the eastern parts of Chiayi County and Tainan. Provincinal highways 82, 84, and 86 as well as National Freeway 8 provide connections between Freeways 1 and 3. In Kaohsiung the freeway bypasses the downtown area and travels along the mountainous rural districts. Connections to downtown and Kaohsiung International Airport are available through National Freeway 10, which the freeway intersects in the rural district of Yanchao, as well as Provincial Highway 88 in the urban township of Chaozhou in Pingtung County. After passing though the intersection with Freeway 10, the freeway enters Pingtung and ends in Dapengwan National Scenic Area in the rural township of Linbian. The southern stretch of the highway is known as the Southern Second Highway.

Naming
Freeways in Taiwan are officially coded "Freeways" with their respective numbers. By this principle, national freeway 3 is coded Freeway No. 3 in official documents or on road signs. Besides the numeric name, on November 1st, 2004 it was named the Formosa Freeway in a naming competition; however, its old alias Second Freeway ( or ) is more popular among the road users.

History
The original plan was only intended to build a second freeway between Taipei and Hsinchu. The construction began in 1987. Tucheng IC - Sanying IC was opened in January 1993, followed by Zhonghe IC to Hsinchu SIC in August 1993. Extension from Hsinchu SIC to Xiangshan IC was finished in February 1996. In March 1996, Xizhi SIC - Muzha IC was opened. The final phase of the north section was Muzha IC. - Zhonghe IC, which was completed in August 1997. The extension between Xizhi SIC and Jijin IC completed in August 2000.

The construction of the freeway south of Hsinchu City began in 1993. In February 2000, Xinhua JCT. - Jiuru IC. was open for the traffic. It was followed by Douliu IC - Xinhua JCT. In November 2001, Xiangshan IC. - Zhunan IC in December 2001, Zhunan IC - Houlong IC in May 2002, Caotun IC - Douliu IC in June 2002, Zhonggang SIC - Longjing IC in October 2002, and Houlong IC - Zhonggang JCT., Kuaiguan IC - Caotun IC in January 2003. The entire project was completed in January 2004 when Longjing IC - Kuaiguan IC was opened.

2010 landslide 
On 25 April 2010, a landslide occurred on a segment near Xizhi. A large amount of dirt buried both directions of the freeway. Four cars were buried under the debris, killing four people. Bad hillside anchoring was blamed as a possible cause, as it had not been raining at the time of the collapse and an earthquake was not registered.

Repairs to the freeway were completed on 19 June 2010 and normal traffic flow restored.

Exit list

Major cities that have exit along the route

Keelung City
New Taipei City
Taipei City
Hsinchu City
Eastern Taichung City
Changhua City
Nantou City
Douliu City

Intersections with other freeways and expressways
Provincial Highway No. 62 at Madong JCT. in Keelung City
Freeway No. 1 at Xizhi JCT. in New Taipei City
Provincial Highway No. 5 at Nangang IC. in New Taipei City
Freeway No. 5 at Nangang JCT. in Taipei City
Freeway No. 3A at Muzha IC. in Taipei City
Provincial Highway No. 64 at Zhonghe IC. in New Taipei City
Freeway No. 2 at Yingge JCT. in New Taipei City
Provincial Highway No. 66 at Daxi IC. in Taoyuan City
Freeway No. 1 at Hsinchu JCT. in Baoshan, Hsinchu
Provincial Highway No. 61 at Xibin IC. in Zhunan, Miaoli
Freeway No. 4 at Zhonggang JCT. in Taichung City
Freeway No. 1 at Changhua JCT. in Changhua City
Provincial Highway No. 74 at Kuaiguan IC. in Changhua City
Provincial Highway No. 63 at Zhongtou IC. in Taichung City
Freeway No. 6 at Zhongheng JCT. in Taichung City
Provincial Highway No. 76 at Zhongxing JCT. in Caotun, Nantou
Provincial Highway No. 78 at Gukeng JCT. in Gukeng, Yunlin
Provincial Highway No. 82 at Shuishang JCT. in Shuishang, Chiayi
Provincial Highway No. 84 at Guantian JCT. in Tainan City
Freeway No. 8 at Xinhua JCT. in Tainan City
Provincial Highway No. 86 at Guanmiao IC. in Tainan City
Freeway No. 10 at Yanchao JCT. in Kaohsiung City
Provincial Highway No. 88 at Zhutian JCT. in Zhutian, Pingtung

Lanes
The lanes in each direction are listed below.
4 lanes:
Zhonghe IC. - Yingge JCT.
Wufeng IC. - Nantou IC.
3 lanes:
Jijin IC. - Zhonghe IC.
Yingge JCT. - Wufeng IC.
Nantou IC. - Jiuru IC.
2 lanes:
Jiuru IC. - Linbian End

Spur routes
Freeway 3A (Taipei)

See also
 Highway system in Taiwan

References

Freeway No. 03